Pseudotyrannochthoniidae is a family of pseudoscorpions, belonging to the superfamily Chthonioidea. It represents the most basal and primitive group of living pseudoscorpions, containing 50 species in 5 genera. Living members of the group have a strongly disjunct distribution, likely reflecting ancient vicariance, occurring in Australia, Asia, Southern Africa and Madagascar, Western North America and southern South America. Fossils species are known from the Eocene Baltic and Bitterfeld amber, which represent members of extant Asian genera.

Taxonomy 

 Afrochthonius Beier, 1930 South Africa, Madagascar and Sri Lanka
 Allochthonius Chamberlin, 1929 eastern Asia (Fossil species known from Baltic amber)
 Centrochthonius Beier, 1931 Central Asia (Fossil species known from Bitterfeld amber)
 Pseudotyrannochthonius Beier, 1930 from Chile, Australia, eastern Asia, and the western United States
 Selachochthonius Chamberlin, 1929 South Africa

References 

Pseudoscorpion families